Razor is an ASP.NET programming syntax used to create dynamic web pages with the C# or VB.NET programming languages. Razor was in development in June 2010 and was released for Microsoft Visual Studio 2010 in January 2011. Razor is a simple-syntax view engine and was released as part of MVC 3 and the WebMatrix tool set.

Razor became a component of AspNetWebStack and then became a part of ASP.NET Core.

Design
The Razor syntax is a template markup syntax, based on the C# programming language, that enables the programmer to use an HTML construction workflow. Instead of using the ASP.NET Web Forms (.aspx) markup syntax with <%= %> symbols to indicate code blocks, Razor syntax starts code blocks with an @ character and does not require explicit closing of the code-block.

The idea behind Razor is to provide an optimized syntax for HTML generation using a code-focused templating approach, with minimal transition between HTML and code. The design reduces the number of characters and keystrokes, and enables a more fluid coding workflow by not requiring explicitly denoted server blocks within the HTML code. Other advantages that have been noted:
 Supports IntelliSense – statement completion support
 Supports "layouts" – an alternative to the "master page" concept in classic Web Forms (.aspx)
 Unit testable

See also 

 Blazor

References

External links 

 Introduction to Razor Pages in ASP.NET Core  at Microsoft Docs
 ASP.NET Web Pages at Microsoft Docs
 Overview of ASP.NET Core MVC at Microsoft Docs
 ASP.NET MVC at Microsoft Docs
  (archived). Current development is held at 

Razor
Free and open-source software
Microsoft application programming interfaces
Microsoft free software
Microsoft Visual Studio
Software using the Apache license
Template engines
Web frameworks
2010 software
Windows-only free software